Józef Piotr Klim (born October 19, 1960 in Mońki) is a Polish politician. He was elected to Sejm on 25 September 2005 getting 7815 votes in 24 – Białystok for Civic Platform. Józef became a headmaster of Liceum Ogólnokształcące Politechniki Białostockiej in 2018.

See also
Members of Polish Sejm 2005-2007

External links
Józef Piotr Klim - parliamentary page - includes declarations of interest, voting record, and transcripts of speeches.

1960 births
Members of the Polish Sejm 2005–2007
Members of the Polish Sejm 2007–2011
Schoolteachers from Białystok
Civic Platform politicians
Living people